Jóss Jáffé (born October 1, 1980) is a musician and producer. He is known for work in new age, world music, reggae and electronic genres, and has collaborated with award-winning singer Mykal Rose as well as artists Jai Uttal and Donna De Lory.



Biography 
Jaffe was born in Santa Barbara, California and grew up in Carpinteria. He began playing guitar and writing songs at age 9 and later began studying sarode & vocal music from Ali Akbar Khan in 1997. He has studied tabla from Swapan Chaudhuri & Zakir Hussain.

Music 
Joss Jaffe's music has been described as a "cross-cultural blend." Jaffe has performed at transformational festivals and events featuring yoga such as Lightning in a Bottle, Wanderlust, Lucidity and Bhakti Fest. He has performed and taught internationally such as in Taiwan. In 2019 his music was released on the Be Why Music record label.

Discography 

 Dub Mantra (2012)
 Dub Mantra Sangha (2015) – with Mykal Rose, Jai Uttal and Donna De Lory
 Dub Mantra Sangha Remix (2018) – with Jai Uttal, Donna De Lory and Dubmatix
 Meditation Music (2019)

References 

1980 births
New-age musicians
People from Carpinteria, California
Living people